Sunday Night, later named Michelob Presents Night Music, is a late-night television show which aired for two seasons between 1988 and 1990 as a showcase for jazz and eclectic musical artists. It was hosted by Jools Holland and David Sanborn, and featured Marcus Miller as musical director. Guests included acts such as Sonny Rollins, Shinehead, Sister Carol, Sonic Youth, Richard Thompson, Jo-El Sonnier, Joe Sample, Slim Gaillard, Elliott Sharp, Pere Ubu, Pharoah Sanders, and many others. In addition, vintage clips of jazz legends like Thelonious Monk, Dave Brubeck, and Billie Holiday were also featured. The show also featured a house band of Omar Hakim (drums), Marcus Miller (bass), Philippe Saisse (keys), David Sanborn (sax), Hiram Bullock (guitar), and Jools Holland (piano). The show often allowed its guests ample time to explain the origins of their sound, meaning of songs, etc. It also provided a national audience for lesser-known acts (such as Arto Lindsay's band, Ambitious Lovers). Hal Willner was the music coordinator, responsible for the interesting musical mix-and-matching that took place on the show.

Cast and crew

Episodes

References

External links
 All About Jazz discussion forum, with detailed episode listings, as copied from Broadway Video defunct web site listing
 It was the greatest show on television, Thus Spake Drake blog, July 23, 2005, with production details, episode listings, and partial song performance listings
 Petition to reissue Night Music (Sunday Night) TV series on DVD or iTunes
 

1988 American television series debuts
1990 American television series endings
1980s American late-night television series
1990s American late-night television series
1980s American music television series
1990s American music television series
English-language television shows
First-run syndicated television programs in the United States
Television series by Broadway Video